Mitr Chaibancha (Thai มิตร ชัยบัญชา (pronunciation), 28 January 1934 in Phetchaburi, Thailand - 8 October 1970) was a Thai film actor who acted 266 films from 1956 to 1970.
He died on 8 October 1970 at Dongtan Beach, Jomtien, South Pattaya, after falling from a helicopter during the filming of a stunt for the final scene of Insee thong (Golden Eagle).

At the height of his career in the 1960s, Mitr, along with Petchara Chaowarat, made a string of hit films that packed cinemas. Of the 75 to 100 films produced each year by the Thai film industry during this period, Mitr starred in nearly half of them.

Early life
Mitr was born into poverty, named Bunting ("abandoned by destiny"), which was the name given to him by a monk. His parents separated when he was an infant. His father was a non-commissioned police officer. His mother came to Bangkok for work as a greengrocer and a better financial position. At age 8, Mitr moved to Bangkok's Nang Loeng neighborhood to live with a newly married mother, where he took the surname Phumhem. This was the surname of his stepfather. He was then enrolled in a Thai boxing school. He became the lightweight boxing champion for his school in 1949 and 1951, and went on to win three lightweight division titles. After finishing secondary school, he studied at Pranakhon College. He was then accepted into the Royal Thai Air Force aviation school, where he was trained as a pilot. After graduation, he worked as a flight instructor at Don Muang Royal Thai Air Force Base.

In 1956 some friends showed his photograph to journalist Kingkaew Kaewprasert, who introduced him to Surat Pukkawet, the editor of a movie magazine. Before long Mitra starred in his first film, Chart Sua (Tiger Instinct). It was then he decided to change his name from Pichet Pumhem to Mitr Chaibancha. He caught the attention of movie fans after starring in Chao Nakleng (Gangster Lord), using the character name Rom Ritthikrai from author Sake Dusit's Insee Daeng (Red Eagle) series of novels.

He married his wife, Jaruwan, in 1959. In 1961 a son, Yuthana, or Ton, was born. However, the marriage ended in a divorce.

Height of fame
In 1961 Mitr starred in Banthuk Rak Pimchawee (Love Diary of Pimchawee), his first film with Petchara Chaowarat. This was the beginning of the most celebrated hero-heroine partnerships in Thai cinematic history. The Mitr-Petchara duo made about 165 films together.

One of the pair's most famous films was 1970's Monrak luk thung (or Magical Love of the Countryside), a musical romantic comedy rhapsodizing Thai rural life.

Mitr was an extremely busy actor and was always on the move, going from set to set and sleeping as little as a two or three hours per night.

Another of his best-known movies, Pet Tad Pet (Operation Bangkok), was shot in both Bangkok and Hong Kong, and featured Kecha Plianvitheee and Luecha Naruenart as the villains, as well as Hong Kong's then top actress, Regina Piping.

Monrak luk thung was one of Mitr's last films. It played in Bangkok cinemas for a solid six months in 1970 and took in 6 million baht, its popularity spurred by the best-selling soundtrack album and Mitr's accidental death while filming Insee Thong.

His last film
Insee thong was the first film that Mitr produced himself, and it featured the return of his popular character, the masked crime-fighter, Insee Daeng (Red Eagle), the secret alter ego of alcoholic detective Rom Rittikrai.

On the last day of shooting, the script called for Mitr, having vanquished the villains, to fly off into the sunset in a helicopter. As the camera rolled, Mitr leapt from the ground to grab a rope ladder hanging from the aircraft, only managing to reach the lowest rung. Unaware of this, the helicopter pilot flew higher and higher, and Mitr finally lost his grip and fell to the ground. The accident was all caught on film and was actually left in the final theatrical release. The fatal fall has since been removed from DVD versions of the film, with Mitr simply flying off into the distance and some onscreen text paying tribute to the star.

It was another death that would make 1970 a difficult year for the Thai film industry, as months earlier pioneering director Rattana Pestonji collapsed while giving a speech urging government officials to support the domestic film industry. He died several hours later.

Mitr’s death was ruled as a tragic accident. For safety, there should have been two shots for the final scene. The first would have been of Mitr grabbing the ladder and flying off at low altitude. Then, a stunt double would have performed a second shot at a higher altitude.

Funeral and memorial shrine

On the day of his funeral, the streets leading to the Buddhist temple were packed, with tens of thousands trying to attend his cremation rites. On the DVD of Insee thong, release in 2005 in Thailand, one of the special features is footage of the cremation ceremony. Mitr's body is held up so the throngs of onlookers could catch a last glimpse of the dead star. He was survived by his former wife and one son.

A memorial shrine to Mitr is situated on a small street in Jomtien, off Jomtien Road in front of the Amphoe Bang Lamung Revenue Department, behind Jomtien Palm Beach Hotel. The shrine is open from 6:00 a.m. to 6:00 p.m. daily. Inside the spirit house is a statue of Mitr holding a pistol in his right hand, reminiscent of his numerous roles as an action movie star. The walls are lined with photographs and other memorabilia. Fortune seekers visit the shrine, shake Kau Cim sticks and then check for the corresponding fortune on tablets hung on the shrine. If wishes have been granted, fortune seekers return and purchase a small offering to leave at the shrine.

Partial filmography
 Operation Bangkok (Pet Tad Pet) (1966)
 Top Secret (1967)
 Monrak luk thung (Magical Love of the Countryside) (1970)
 Insee thong (Golden Eagle) (1970)
 The Tiger and the Dragon (1971)

References

 Tupchai, Suchada (2005) Adoring fans remember famous Thai film star Mitr Chiabancha, Pattaya Mail. Retrieved 23 December 2005.
 Rithdee, Kong (2005) Fallen idols, Bangkok Post. Retrieved 23 December 2005.
 Fleshman, Erich (2005) A Brief History of Thai Cinema, Notes from Hollywood. Retrieved 23 December 2005.
 Saenkhum, Tanita (2003)  Remembering Mitr, The Nation. Retrieved 23 December 2005.
 The Cremation of Mitr Chaibancha, special features, Insee thong DVD, 2005.

External links

Mitr Chaibancha at the Thai Film Database
Review of Insee thong at Rotten Tomatoes

1934 births
1970 deaths
Mitr Chaibancha
Mitr Chaibancha
Mitr Chaibancha
Mitr Chaibancha
Accidental deaths from falls
Mitr Chaibancha
Mitr Chaibancha
Filmed deaths of entertainers
Mitr Chaibancha